This is a list of electoral district results for the 2015 New South Wales state election.

Albury

Auburn

Ballina

Balmain

Bankstown

Barwon

Bathurst

Baulkham Hills

Bega

Blacktown

Blue Mountains

Cabramatta

Camden

Campbelltown

Canterbury

Castle Hill

Cessnock

Charlestown

Clarence

Coffs Harbour

Coogee

Cootamundra

Cootamundra was a new seat combining most of the abolished district of Burrinjuck with the eastern part of the abolished district of Murrumbidgee. Katrina Hodgkinson was the member for Burrinjuck and the member for Murrumbidgee, Adrian Piccoli successfully contested [[Results of the 2015 New South Wales state election (Legislative Assembly)#Murray|Murray]].

Cronulla

Davidson

Drummoyne

Dubbo

East Hills

Epping

Fairfield

Gosford

Goulburn

Granville

Hawkesbury

Heathcote

Heffron

Holsworthy

Holsworthy was a new seat largely replacing the abolished district of Menai. Melanie Gibbons was the member for Meani.

Hornsby

Keira

Kiama

Kogarah

Ku-ring-gai

Lake Macquarie

Lakemba

Lane Cove

Lismore

Liverpool

Londonderry

Macquarie Fields

Maitland

Manly

Maroubra

Miranda

Barry Collier won the seat at the 2013 by-election with a swing of 26%.

Monaro

Mount Druitt

Mulgoa

Murray

Muray was a new seat combining most of the abolished district of Murrumbidgee and the southern part of the abolished district of Murray-Darling. Adrian Piccoli was the member for Murrumbidgee and the member for Murray-Darling, John Williams, was an unsuccessful candidate at the election for the Legislative Council.

Myall Lakes

Newcastle

Newtown

Newtown was a new seat, partly replacing the abolished district of Marrickville. The member for Marrickville, Carmel Tebbutt, did not contest the election. Newtown was a notional Green seat as a result of the redistribution.

North Shore

Northern Tablelands

Oatley

Orange

Oxley

Parramatta

Penrith

Pittwater

Port Macquarie

Port Stephens

Prospect

Prospect was a new seat largely replacing the abolished district of Smithfield. Andrew Rohan was the member for Smithfield.

Riverstone

Rockdale

Ryde

Seven Hills

Shellharbour

South Coast

Strathfield

Summer Hill

Summer Hill was a new seat, combining part of the abolished district of Marrickville with parts of Canterbury, Strathfield and Balmain. The member for Marrickville, Carmel Tebbutt, did not contest the election. Summer Hill was a notional Labor seat as a result of the redistribution.

Swansea

Sydney

Tamworth

Terrigal

The Entrance

Tweed

Upper Hunter

Vaucluse

Wagga Wagga

Wakehurst

Wallsend

Willoughby

Wollondilly

Wollongong

Wyong

References

2015